Peerless Coal Company Store is a historic company store building located at Vivian, McDowell County, West Virginia.  It was designed by architect Alex B. Mahood and built in 1921, and the main block of the brick store building is two-stories with one-story flanking wings.  It has a concrete parapet that defines the facade's roofline on both the two and one-story sections. It features a modern design, irregular plan, stone foundation, and simple decoration.

It was listed on the National Register of Historic Places in 1992.

References

Alex B. Mahood buildings
Commercial buildings completed in 1921
Commercial buildings on the National Register of Historic Places in West Virginia
National Register of Historic Places in McDowell County, West Virginia
Moderne architecture in West Virginia
Company stores in the United States